Latif Yahia  (Laṭīf Yaḥīa; born 14 June 1964)  is an Iraqi human rights activist, blogger and former lieutenant in the Iran–Iraq War. He is known for being the alleged former body double of Uday Hussein.

Biography
Yahia was born to a wealthy merchant family of Iraqi Kurdish origin who had long been settled in Baghdad. He alleges that he became Uday's double in September 1987 during the Iran–Iraq War, in which he was a lieutenant. He was born 4 days before Uday’s official birth date. At the age of 23, he was summoned from the frontlines to the presidential palace, where he discovered that Uday remembered that classmates had remarked on the resemblance between the two when they were in school together. Yahia was informed that he was to become Uday's fedai (body double) to make public appearances as Uday whenever a dangerous situation was expected. Yahia initially refused to take the job and was subsequently put in solitary confinement. After his imprisonment, Latif agreed to be Uday's double. He was trained for six months to imitate Uday's speech patterns and manner. He underwent surgery and dental work to make their appearances more similar. During the Iraqi invasion of Kuwait, Yahia was used as a morale booster for the Iraqi troops and sent to Basra posing as Uday to meet with troops.

His relationship with Uday later deteriorated. According to Yahia, the final straw came when a woman Uday was interested in paid more attention to Yahia. Uday shot at him, grazing him. When ordered to kill the father of a beauty pageant holder, a defiant Yahia slit his arms in front of Uday and the father. Yahia fled north in November 1991, where he was arrested by Kurdish Peshmerga, being mistaken for Uday. When they realized he was not Uday, he was released and granted asylum in Austria in 1992. After Yahia was attacked in Austria, he moved to London in 1995.

On 10 March 1997, Yahia allegedly threatened a refugee official in Norway, showing up at his office with a can of gasoline, pouring it out over the floor, and threatening to light it. The official managed to "calm" Yahia, who fled after half an hour. He was subsequently arrested by the police. He was released before his trial and left the country, first to Germany, then to Ireland.

Challenges to Yahia's claims
Irish Times journalist Eoin Butler and Sunday Times journalist Ed Caesar have questioned Yahia's various claims, including that he was Uday Hussein's body double, and pointed out that many of Yahia's activities since leaving Iraq in 1992, including his education, have not been verified.

In 2007, Butler interviewed Yahia and highlighted inconsistencies in many of Yahia's statements. In 2011, just before the release of The Devil's Double, Butler commented that Yahia's stories about when he was Uday's double were "to put it mildly, far-fetched." After the 2007 interview, Yahia's ex-wife contacted Butler and told him that when she first met Yahia, he used a different name, Khalid al-Kubaisi. After the two married, she heard for the first time that Yahia claimed to have been Uday's body double, which she found "dubious".

In 2011, Caesar interviewed various people from the time of the Hussein regime. Although Saddam's purported use of body doubles was widely known, two confidantes of Uday Hussein denied that he used doubles. One said that Yahia was arrested for impersonation of Uday in 1990, and the other corroborated the incident, also stating that Yahia pretended to be Uday to pick up women. A private guard at Saddam's presidential palace from 1989 to 2003 also denied that Uday used doubles. Saddam Hussein's former doctor and a plastic surgeon at the Ibn Sina hospital said that the reconstructive surgery Yahia claims to have undergone there was never performed. The doctor also said he operated on Uday many times and Uday never had a body double. A former CIA case officer in Iraq, who claimed to know every asset in Iraq at the time and had friends who were close to the Hussein brothers, had never heard of Yahia, nor heard of Uday ever using doubles. Yahia disputes these claims, saying that his very existence was a state secret.

Personal life
Yahya currently lives in Ireland. He is married and has 2 children. He also lived in Cyprus.

Film
The movie The Devil's Double, directed by Lee Tamahori and starring Dominic Cooper as Yahia and Uday, premiered at the 2011 Sundance Film Festival on 22 January 2011.

Yahia was also the subject of an episode of National Geographic Channel's Locked Up Abroad in 2012.

Books
 I was Saddam's Son released on 1 May 1994 by Arcade Publishing. Hardcover: 250 pages. Co-author: Karl Wendl.
 The Devil's Double released on 5 June 2003 by Arrow Books Ltd. Paperback: 334 pages.
 The Black Hole released on 20 November 2006 by Arcanum Publishing. Paperback: 224 pages
 The Hangman of Abu Ghraib released on 20 November 2015 by Arcanum Publishing. Paperback: 484 pages.

References

External links
 
 

1964 births
Living people
Iraqi bloggers
Iraqi military personnel
Iraqi military personnel of the Iran–Iraq War
Iraqi political writers
Iraqi Kurdish people
Iraqi Sunni Muslims
20th-century Iraqi writers
Iraqi memoirists
Iraqi emigrants to Ireland